The Two Cousins is a 1716 oil-on-canvas painting by Antoine Watteau, now in the Louvre Museum, in Paris, which acquired it in 1990.

References

Further reading
 
 
 
 
 
 
 
 
 
 
 
 
 
 
 

1710s paintings
Paintings by Antoine Watteau
Paintings in the Louvre by French artists